The Sea Lion is a 1921 American silent adventure film directed by Rowland V. Lee, and starring Hobart Bosworth, Bessie Love, and Emory Johnson. It was produced and distributed by Associated Producers Incorporated. The team who worked on this film had previously made Lee's Blind Hearts (1921).

The film has preserved in the collections of the Library of Congress, the UCLA Film and Television Archive and the Pacific Film Archive. It is also in the public domain.

Plot 
Captain John Nelson (Hobart Bosworth) and his crew hunt whales on the high seas. The captain is an angry man, having never recovered from his wife's leaving him for another man 20 years prior. When the ship comes to port, Tom (Emory Johnson), a young man, joins the crew as a lookout. He is distraught as well, having been jilted by his fiancée.

Back on the seas, the ship's inexperienced crew mistakes the water supply as a leak and pumps it overboard. The captain rations the remaining water, and stores it in his quarters. The crew mutinies.

From the crow's nest, Tom spots a nearby island and comes down to tell the captain while the crew is asleep. The captain makes Tom the first mate, and they steer the ship to the nearby island. The island is inhabited by two survivors of an earlier shipwreck, one of whom is a beautiful young Blossom (Bessie Love). The survivors are brought back to the ship, where the captain resists letting them, board. The survivors promise to work on the ship, and he reluctantly agrees to let them travel.

Blossom learns that the captain's family name is Nelson, and says that her mother had the same name. The captain realizes that Blossom is the daughter of his wife, but assumes Blossom's father is another man. Blossom tells him that she never knew her father. During a storm at sea, the captain finds Blossom's Bible, which contains a note from her mother saying that she loved him all along. The captain realizes that Blossom is his daughter, and they are reconciled. Blossom and Tom fall in love.

Cast

Production 
Scenes were filmed aboard the Fox, which was anchored off Balboa in Orange County.

References

External links 

 
 
 
 
 

1920s adventure drama films
1921 films
American adventure drama films
American black-and-white films
American silent feature films
Films about whaling
Films directed by Rowland V. Lee
Films shot in California
Surviving American silent films
1921 drama films
Films with screenplays by Joseph F. Poland
1920s English-language films
1920s American films
Silent American drama films
Silent adventure drama films